Mort Aux Vaches (English: Death to Cows) is Tim Hecker's fourth release. It is a part of Staalplaat's series of live releases from a wide range of artists of the same name. Hecker's recording is from a live set for Dutch national radio VPRO, recorded on 3 May 2004.

Track listing

External links
[ Allmusic's information page for Mort Aux Vaches]
Staalplaat's information page for Mort Aux Vaches

2005 albums
Tim Hecker albums